Air Marshal Shyam Bihari Prasad Sinha, PVSM, AVSM, VM, ADC is a retired officer of Indian Air Force who served as Air Officer Commanding-in-Chief (AOC-in-C), Central Air Command from 1 January 2016 to 31 December 2018. He assumed office from Air Marshal Kulwant Singh Gill and was succeeded by Air Marshal Rajesh Kumar. AVSM, VM.

Early life and education 
Sinha is an alumnus of National Defence Academy, Pune and Defence Services Staff College, Wellington. He has also taken the Operational Electronic Warfare course in France and the Executive course on Security Studies in United States.

Career 
Sinha was commissioned into the fighter stream of the Indian Air Force on 15 June 1980. He has clocked over 3700 hours of flying and has experience on many different types of fighters. He held several key operational and administrative appointments at various stages of his service including the Commanding Officer of a MiG-21 Squadron; Commandant of Electronic Warfare Range; Team Leader of AWACS Project Team in Israel; Air Officer Commanding of a front line Su-30 MKI Base; Assistant Chief of the Air Staff (Plans); Principal Director Plans, Principal Director C4ISR; Principal Director Acquisitions; Deputy Director of Operations (Electronic Warfare); Chief Flying Instructor of Basic Flying Training School; Air Force Examiner in Aircrew Examining Board and the Deputy Chief of the Air Staff (30 April 2014 - 31 December 2015). He is a Category A Flying Instructor, Instrument Rating Instructor and Examiner. He was also the Commodore Commandant of No. 7 Squadron.

Awards and medals 
During 38 years of his career, he has been awarded several medals: two Presidential medals, the Ati Vishisht Seva Medal (January 2011), the Vayu Sena Medal. and the Param Vishisht Seva Medal (January 2018).

Personal life 
He is married to Alpana Sinha and they have a son. His brother B B P Sinha was also an Air Marshal in the Indian Air Force.

References 

Year of birth missing (living people)
Living people
Indian Air Force air marshals
Recipients of the Param Vishisht Seva Medal
Recipients of the Ati Vishisht Seva Medal
Recipients of the Vayu Sena Medal
Defence Services Staff College alumni
National Defence Academy (India) alumni